Dawson Turner (15 December 1846 – 25 February 1909) was a rugby union international who represented England from 1871 to 1875.

Early life
Dawson Palgrave Turner was born on 15 December 1846 in Calcutta, India. He was the son of Gurney Turner (1813 to 1848) and Mary Anne Hamilton Mowatt. His paternal grandfather, after whom he was named, was Dawson Turner (1775 to 1858) the banker and botanist, and he got his middle name from his paternal grandmother, Mary Palgrave (1774–1850). He attended Rugby School

Rugby union career
Turner, having played rugby at school, went on to play for Richmond F.C., one of the clubs of choice for Old Rugbeians. Turner made his international debut on 27 March 1871 at Edinburgh in the Scotland vs England match.
Of the 6 matches he played for his national side he was on the winning side on 3 occasions and he played in the first five matches against Scotland, the only man to do so. He was described as a "desperately hardworking forward, always keen and untiring" and "regardless of risk or danger". He played his final match for England on 8 March 1875 at Edinburgh in the Scotland vs England match.

Career and personal life
On 12 March 1867 he married Emma Morgan in St.Johns church, Toronto. They had at least two children, Harold Palgrave Turner (born 1872 in London) and Mary Hamilton Turner (born 1873 in Peterborough, Canada West). He initially trained as a doctor and in 1871 was student Obstetrician at University College Hospital, By 1891 he had divorced Emma and described himself as a retired military officer. He died in March 1909 in England.

References

1846 births
1909 deaths
Alumni of the UCL Medical School
England international rugby union players
English rugby union players
People educated at Rugby School
Richmond F.C. players
Rugby union forwards